Mary Stewart Gibson (21 February 1904 – 5 March 1989) was a Scottish artist, who spent most of her life living and working in Paris.

Early life and education 
Mary Gibson was born in Longridge, West Lothian, Scotland in 1904, the second daughter of Reverend John Gibson, minister of the local United Free church, and Mrs. Ellie Brown Gibson. She was a pupil at Bathgate Academy in Bathgate, West Lothian for four years, before studying at Glasgow School of Art.

Life in Paris 

In 1923, after the death of her father, Mary Gibson fulfilled a long-standing ambition and moved to Paris, with her mother and sister. She was a student at several studios, in particular that of Emile Renard, and "mixed with the leading artists and intellectuals of the 1920s." She lived and worked in a studio on the Boulevard Arago in the 13th arrondissement in Paris, and later moved to a studio opposite the Santé prison in the adjacent 14th arrondissement. In 1940, following the occupation of Paris, Gibson was arrested as an enemy alien and was interned first at Besançon and then at Vittel, where she was a "chef de bloc" in charge of 350 women inmates, until the camp was liberated in 1944. She subsequently returned to her studio in Paris.

Mary Gibson's art 

Gibson was "a prominent member of the second generation of Scottish colourists." As early as 1926, she had a painting accepted for that year's Salon in Paris, the city's main annual art exhibition. It was a portrait of an old peasant woman. In 1932, her work was exhibited at the spring Salon of the Société Nationale des Beaux Arts. She also exhibited her work at one of the Salons of the Artistes Français, at the Galeries Georges Petit in 1929, and in the annual exhibitions of the Indépendants. After the Second World War, she continued to exhibit regularly in Scotland and Paris, in particular at the Art Centre, Edinburgh in 1955 during that year's Festival, and at the Wall Studio in Edinburgh in 1960. Mary travelled extensively, finding subject matter in Holland, Switzerland, Spain, Egypt, Italy, and many parts of France; island settings were a special favourite of hers.

Life in the community 

Mary Gibson was well known as a raconteur, and hosted parties for her friends of many nationalities at her Paris studio. According to an article in The Scotsman in 1977, she was "a cornerstone of the Scots community and a causeway into the French one." She died on 5 March 1989 at L'Hôpital Broca in Paris. A memorial service was held for her at the Scots Kirk in Paris on 6 April 1989.

References 

1904 births
1985 deaths
20th-century Scottish painters
20th-century Scottish women artists
Alumni of the Glasgow School of Art
People educated at Bathgate Academy
People from West Lothian
Scottish women painters